Andrew Vabre Devine (October 7, 1905 – February 18, 1977) was an American character actor known for his distinctive raspy, crackly voice  and roles in Western films, including his role as Cookie, the sidekick of Roy Rogers in 10 feature films. He also appeared alongside John Wayne in films such as Stagecoach (1939), The Man Who Shot Liberty Valance, and How the West Was Won (both 1962). He is also remembered as Jingles on the TV series The Adventures of Wild Bill Hickok from 1951 to 1958, as Danny McGuire in A Star Is Born (1937), and as the voice of Friar Tuck in the Disney Animation Studio film Robin Hood (1973).

Early life
Devine was born in Flagstaff, Arizona, on October 7, 1905. He grew up in Kingman, Arizona, where his family moved when he was one year old. His father was Thomas Devine Jr., born in 1869 in Kalamazoo County, Michigan. Andy's grandfather, Thomas Devine Sr., was born in 1842 in County Tipperary, Ireland, and immigrated to the United States in 1852. Andy's mother was Amy Ward, a granddaughter of Commander James H. Ward, the first officer of the United States Navy killed during the Civil War.

He attended St. Mary and St. Benedict's College, Northern Arizona State Teacher's College, and was a football player at Santa Clara University. He also played semiprofessional football under the pseudonym Jeremiah Schwartz. His football experience led to his first sizable film role in The Spirit of Notre Dame in 1931.

Career

Devine had an ambition to act, so after college, he went to Hollywood, where he worked as a lifeguard at Venice Beach, in easy distance of the studios. While filming Doctor Bull at Fox Studios in 1933, he met Dorothy House (1915–2000). They were married on October 28, 1933, in Las Vegas, Nevada, and remained united until his death, on February 18, 1977. They had two children, Timothy Andrew (Tad) Devine and Dennis Patrick Gabriel Devine.

His peculiar wheezy voice was first thought likely to prevent him from moving to the talkies, but instead, it became his trademark. Devine claimed that his distinctive voice resulted from a childhood accident in which he fell while running with a curtain rod in his mouth at the Beale Hotel in Kingman, causing the rod to pierce the roof of his mouth. When he was able to speak again, he had a labored, scratchy, duo-tone voice. A biographer, however, indicated that this was one of several stories Devine fabricated about his voice. His son Tad related in an interview for Encore Westerns Channel (Jim Beaver, reporting from the 2007 Newport Beach Film Festival) that there indeed had been an accident, but he was uncertain if it caused his father's unusual voice. When asked if he had strange nodes on his vocal cords, Devine replied, "I've got the same nodes as Bing Crosby, but his are in tune."

Devine first attempted stand-up comedy, as he was part of a Vegas act called Three Fat Guys, along with David Arvedon and Jackie Gleason.  They had back-and-forth banter on stage revolving around second-rate jokes, which did not get much reaction from the audience.  After Devine and Gleason left the act, Devine appeared in more than 400 films and shared with Walter Brennan, another character actor, the rare ability to move with ease from B-movie Westerns to feature films. His notable roles included Cookie, Roy Rogers' sidekick, in 10 films; a role in Romeo and Juliet (1936), and Danny in A Star Is Born (1937). He appeared in several films with John Wayne, including Stagecoach (1939), Island in the Sky (1953), and The Man Who Shot Liberty Valance (1962).

He was a long-time contract player with Universal, which in 1939 paired him with Richard Arlen for a series of fast-paced B-pictures (usually loaded with stock footage) that mixed action and comedy; they made 14 over a two-year period. When Arlen left in 1941, the series continued for another two years, teaming Devine with various actors, often Leo Carrillo.

Most of Devine's characters were reluctant to get involved in the action, but he played the hero in Island in the Sky (1953), as an expert pilot who leads other aviators on an arduous search for a missing airplane. Devine was generally known for his comic roles, but Jack Webb cast him as a police detective in Pete Kelly's Blues (1955), for which Devine lowered his voice and was more serious than usual.

His film appearances in his later years included roles in Zebra in the Kitchen (1965), The Over-the-Hill Gang (1969), and Myra Breckinridge (1970).

Devine worked extensively in radio, and is well remembered for his role as Jingles, Guy Madison's sidekick in The Adventures of Wild Bill Hickok, which the two actors reprised on television. Devine appeared over 75 times on Jack Benny's radio show between 1936 and 1942, often in Benny's semiregular series of Western sketches, "Buck Benny Rides Again". Benny frequently referred to him as "the mayor of Van Nuys". In fact, Devine served as honorary mayor of that city, where he lived, preferring to be away from the bustle of Hollywood, from May 18, 1938, to 1957, when he moved to Newport Beach.

Devine also worked in television. He hosted Andy's Gang, a children's TV show, on NBC from 1955 to 1960. During this time, he also made multiple appearances on NBC's The Ford Show, Starring Tennessee Ernie Ford. In addition, he was a guest star on many television shows in the 1950s and 1960s, including an episode of The Twilight Zone titled "Hocus-Pocus and Frisby", playing the part of Frisby, a teller of tall tales who impresses a group of gullible alien kidnappers. He played Hap Gorman, a character likewise given to tall tales, in five episodes of the NBC TV series Flipper, during its 1964 season. He played the role of Jake Sloan in the 1961 episode "Big Jake" of the acclaimed anthology series The Barbara Stanwyck Show, also on NBC. He also played Honest John Denton in the episode "A Horse of a Different Cutter" of the short-lived series The Rounders.

He made a cameo appearance as Santa Claus in an episode of the 1960s live-action Batman TV series on ABC. The episode, entitled "The Duo Is Slumming", was originally broadcast on December 22, 1966. In this role, he directly addressed the viewers, wishing them a merry Christmas.

Devine made his stage debut in 1957 with his portrayal of Cap'n Andy in Guy Lombardo's production of Show Boat at the Jones Beach Theatre in Wantagh, New York. In 1973, he went to Monroe, Louisiana, at the request of George C. Brian, an actor and filmmaker who headed the theater department at the University of Louisiana at Monroe, to perform in Show Boat.

He also performed voice parts in animated films, including Friar Tuck in Walt Disney's Robin Hood. He provided the voice of Cornelius the Rooster in several TV commercials for Kellogg's Corn Flakes.

Devine was a pilot and owned Provo Devine, a flying school that trained flyers for the government during World War II.

Political views
Devine was a Republican. Devine supported Barry Goldwater in the 1964 United States presidential election.

Death and legacy
Devine died of leukemia at the age of 71 in Irvine, California, on February 18, 1977. Actor Ken Curtis sang at the funeral.

The main street of his hometown of Kingman was renamed Andy Devine Avenue. His career is highlighted in the Mohave Museum of History and Arts in Kingman, and  a star in his honor is on the Hollywood Walk of Fame.  His name also appears in the song "Pencil Thin Mustache" by Jimmy Buffett, which describes the pop culture of his youth, and in Frank Zappa and The Mothers of Invention's song "Andy" on their 1975 album One Size Fits All.  In 2019, on his album Good Dog, Dave Stamey released a song entitled "Andy Devine," recounting tales of encounters with Hollywood Western actors.

Filmography

 The Collegians (1926, short) as student (uncredited)
 Around the Bases (1927, short) as Calford baseball player (uncredited)
 The Relay (1927, Short) as sophomore (uncredited)
 That's My Daddy (1927) as sailor (uncredited)
 Finders Keepers (1928) as doughboy and gate guard (uncredited)
 We Americans (1928) as Pat O'Dougal
 Lonesome (1928) as Jim's friend
 Noah's Ark (1928) as extra (uncredited)
 Red Lips (1928) as a sophomore and as Professor Fountain
 Naughty Baby (1928) as Joe Cassidy
 Why Be Good? (1929) as young man at boiler (uncredited)
 The Divine Lady (1929) as extra (uncredited)
 Hot Stuff (1929) as Bob
 Junior Luck (1929, short) (uncredited)
 His Lucky Day (1929) as roadhouse thug (uncredited)
 Flying High (1929, short) as student admirer (uncredited)
 Dames Ahoy! (1930) as Marine at dance contest (uncredited)
 Shooting Straight (1930) as kibitzer (uncredited)
 A Soldier's Plaything (1930) as doughboy (uncredited)
 The Criminal Code (1931) as Cluck, the convict with a knife (uncredited)
 Heroes of the Flames (1931) as fireman
 Danger Island (1931) as Briney
 The Spirit of Notre Dame (1931) as Truck McCall
 Three Wise Girls (1932) as Jimmy Callahan, the chauffeur
 Law and Order (1932) as Johnny Kinsman
 The Impatient Maiden (1932) as Clarence Howe
 Destry Rides Again (1932) as stagecoach passenger (uncredited, scene deleted)
 Man Wanted (1932) as Andy Doyle
 Radio Patrol (1932) as Pete Wiley
 Fast Companions (1932) as Information Kid
 The Man from Yesterday (1932) as Steve Hand
 Tom Brown of Culver (1932) as Mac
 The All American (1932) as Andy Moran
 The Cohens and Kellys in Trouble (1933) as Andy Moran
 Song of the Eagle (1933) as Mud
 The Big Cage (1933) as Scoops
 Horse Play (1933) as Andy
 Midnight Mary (1933) as Sam
 Doctor Bull (1933) as Larry Ward, the soda jerk
 Saturday's Millions (1933) as Andy Jones
 Chance at Heaven (1933) as Al
 The Poor Rich (1934) as Andy
 Upper World (1934) as Oscar
 Stingaree (1934) as Howie
 Let's Talk It Over (1934) as Gravel
 Million Dollar Ransom (1934) as Careful
 Gift of Gab (1934) as John P. McDougal, the waiter
 Wake Up and Dream (1934) as Joe Egbert, aka Egghead
 The President Vanishes (1934) as Valentine Orcott
 Hell in the Heavens (1934) as Sgt. "Ham" Davis
 Straight from the Heart (1935) as Edwards
 Hold 'Em Yale (1935) as Liverlips
 Chinatown Squad (1935) as George Mason
 The Farmer Takes a Wife (1935) as Elmer Otway
 Way Down East (1935) as Hi Holler
 Fighting Youth (1935) as Cy Kipp
 Coronado (1935) as Pinky Falls
 Small Town Girl (1936) as George Brannan
 Romeo and Juliet (1936) as Peter, a servant of Juliet's nurse
 Yellowstone (1936) as Pay-Day
 The Big Game (1936) as Pop Andrews
 Flying Hostess (1936) as Joe Williams
 Mysterious Crossing (1936) as Carolina
 A Star Is Born (1937) as Danny McGuire
 The Road Back (1937) as Willy
 Double or Nothing (1937) as Half Pint
 You're a Sweetheart (1937) as Daisy Day
 In Old Chicago (1937) as Pickle Bixby
 Doctor Rhythm (1938) as Officer Lawrence O'Roon
 Yellow Jack (1938) as Charlie Spill
 Men with Wings (1938) as Joe Gibbs
 Personal Secretary (1938) as "Snoop" Lewis
 Swing That Cheer (1938) as Doc Saunders
 The Storm (1938) as Swede Hanzen
 Strange Faces (1938) as Hector Hobbs
 Stagecoach (1939) as Buck
 The Spirit of Culver (1939) as Tubby
 Never Say Die (1939) as Henry Munch
 Mutiny on the Blackhawk (1939) as Slim Collins
 Tropic Fury (1939) as Tynan ('Tiny') Andrews
 Legion of Lost Flyers (1939) as "Beef" Brumley
 Geronimo (1939) as Sneezer
 Man from Montreal (1939) as Constable "Bones" Blair
 Danger on Wheels (1940) as "Guppy" Wexel
 Little Old New York (1940) as Commodore
 Buck Benny Rides Again (1940) as Andy
 Torrid Zone (1940) as Wally Davis
 Hot Steel (1940) as Matt Morrison
 Black Diamonds (1940) as Tolliver Higgenbotham
 When the Daltons Rode (1940) as Ozark
 Margie (1940)
 The Leather Pushers (1940) as Andy Adams
 The Devil's Pipeline (1940) as Andy Jennings
 Trail of the Vigilantes (1940) as Meadows
 Lucky Devils (1941) as Andy Tompkins
 Mutiny in the Arctic (1941) as Andy Adams
 The Flame of New Orleans (1941) as first sailor
 Men of the Timberland (1941) as Andy Jensen
 Raiders of the Desert (1941) as Andy "Hammer" McCoy
 A Dangerous Game (1941) as Andy McAllister
 Badlands of Dakota (1941) as Spearfish
 The Kid from Kansas (1941) as Andy
 South of Tahiti (1941) as Moose
 Road Agent (1941) as Andy
 North to the Klondike (1942) as Klondike
 Unseen Enemy (1942) as Detective Sam Dillon
 Escape from Hong Kong (1942) as Blimp
 Danger in the Pacific (1942) as Andy Parker
 Top Sergeant (1942) as Andy Jarrett
 Timber (1942) as Arizona
 Between Us Girls (1942) as Mike Kilinsky
 Sin Town (1942) as "Judge" Eustace Vale
 Keeping Fit (1942, short) as Andy
 Rhythm of the Islands (1943) as Eddie Dolan
 Frontier Badmen (1943) as Slim, a cowhand
 Corvette K-225 (1943) as Walsh
 Crazy House (1943) as Andy Devine
 Ali Baba and the Forty Thieves (1944) as Abdullah
 Follow the Boys (1944) as Andy Devine (uncredited)
 Ghost Catchers (1944) as Horsehead
 Babes on Swing Street (1944) as Joe Costello
 Bowery to Broadway (1944) as Father Kelley
 Frisco Sal (1945) as Bunny
 Sudan (1945) as Nebka
 That's the Spirit (1945) as Martin Wilde Sr.
 Frontier Gal (1945) as Big Ben
 Canyon Passage (1946) as Ben Dance
 The Michigan Kid (1947) as Buster
 Bells of San Angelo (1947) as Sheriff Cookie Bullfincher
 The Vigilantes Return (1947) as Andy
 Springtime in the Sierras (1947) as Cookie Bullfincher
 Slave Girl (1947) as Ben, the fat sailor
 On the Old Spanish Trail (1947) as Constable Cookie Bullfincher
 The Fabulous Texan (1947) as Elihu Mills
 The Gay Ranchero (1948) as Cookie Bullfincher
 Old Los Angeles (1948) as Sam Bowie
 Under California Stars (1948) as Cookie Bullfincher and Alf Bullfincher
 The Gallant Legion (1948) as Windy Hornblower
 Eyes of Texas (1948) as Cookie Bullfincher
 Night Time in Nevada (1948) as Cookie Bullfincher
 Grand Canyon Trail (1948) as Cookie Bullfincher
 The Far Frontier (1948) as Judge Cookie Bullfincher
 The Last Bandit (1949) as Casey Brown
 The Traveling Saleswoman (1950) as Waldo
 Never a Dull Moment (1950) as Orvie
 New Mexico (1951) as Sergeant Garrity
 The Red Badge of Courage (1951) as the cheery soldier
 Slaughter Trail (1951) as Sgt. Macintosh
 Montana Belle (1952) as Pete Bivins
 Island in the Sky (1953) as Willie Moon
 The Two Gun Teacher (1954)
 Thunder Pass (1954) as Injun
 Pete Kelly's Blues (1955) as George Tenell
 Around the World in 80 Days (1956) as first mate of the 'S.S. Henrietta'
 No Place Like Home (1960, TV Movie)
 The Adventures of Huckleberry Finn (1960) as Mr. Carmody
 Two Rode Together (1961) as Sgt. Darius P. Posey
 The Man Who Shot Liberty Valance (1962) as Link Appleyard
 How the West Was Won (1962) as Cpl. Peterson
 It's a Mad, Mad, Mad, Mad World (1963) as Sheriff of Crockett County
 Zebra in the Kitchen (1965) as Branch Hawksbill
 The Ballad of Josie (1967) as Judge Tatum
 Shoestring Safari (1967, TV Movie) as Colonel Hazeltine
 The Road Hustlers (1968) as Sheriff Estep
 The Over-the-Hill Gang (1969, TV Movie) as Judge Amos Polk
 Smoke (1970, TV Movie) as Mr. Stone
 The Phynx (1970) as Andy Devine
 Myra Breckinridge (1970) as Coyote Bill
 The Over-the-Hill Gang Rides Again (1970, TV Movie) as Amos Polk
 Robin Hood (1973) as Friar Tuck (voice)
 Won Ton Ton, the Dog Who Saved Hollywood (1976) as priest in dog pound
 A Whale of a Tale (1976) as Captain Andy
 The Mouse and His Child (1977) as the frog (voice) (final film role)

Television
 The Virginian – "Yesterday´s Timepiece" (1967)
 Adventures of Wild Bill Hickok – 112 episodes as Deputy Marshal Jingles P. Jones (1951–1958)
 Andy's Gang – as Host (1955–1960)
 Wagon Train – episode "The Jess MacAbee Story" as Jess MacAbee (1959)
 The Twilight Zone – "Hocus-Pocus and Frisby" as Frisby (1962)
 Flipper – 5 episodes as Hap Gorman (1964–1965)
 Batman – "The Duo Is Slumming" as Santa (uncredited) (1966)
 Bonanza – "A Girl Named George" as Roscoe (1968)
 Walt Disney's Wonderful World of Color – "Ride a Northbound Horse: Parts 1 & 2" (1969)
 Gunsmoke – episode "Stryker" as Jed Whitlow (1969)
 Walt Disney's Wonderful World of Color – "Smoke: Parts 1 & 2" as Mr. Stone (1970)
 Alias Smith and Jones – "The Men That Corrupted Hadleyburg" as Sheriff Bintell (1972)

See also

 Froggy the Gremlin
 Old Time Radio – Wild Bill Hickok (Andy was Jingles, his sidekick)

References

Further reading
 Devine, Dennis. Your Friend and Mine, Andy Devine, BearManor Media, 2013.

External links

 
 Photos of Andy Devine from Stagecoach by Ned Scott

1905 births
1977 deaths
Male actors from Arizona
Amateur radio people
American male film actors
American people of Irish descent
American male radio actors
American male television actors
Deaths from cancer in California
Deaths from leukemia
People from Flagstaff, Arizona
People from Kingman, Arizona
Santa Clara University alumni
Male Western (genre) film actors
20th-century American male actors
California Republicans
Universal Pictures contract players